Maria Angélica de Sousa Rego, known as Maria Angélica Ribeiro (5 December 18299 April 1880) was a Brazilian playwright. She was the first Brazilian woman to have a play staged in Brazilian theater.

She was the daughter of Maria Leopoldina de Sousa Rego and Marcelino de Sousa Rego. At the age of 14, she married her drawing teacher, João Caetano Ribeiro.

She wrote about twenty plays.

References 

19th-century Brazilian dramatists and playwrights
1829 births
1880 deaths
19th-century Brazilian women writers
Brazilian women dramatists and playwrights
People from Angra dos Reis
People from Paraty